In organic chemistry, pentanonide is a functional group which is composed of a cyclic ketal of a diol with 3-pentanone. It is seen in amcinafal (triamcinolone pentanonide).

See also
 Acetonide
 Acetophenide
 Acroleinide
 Aminobenzal
 Cyclopentanonide

References